The Nauvoo Illinois Temple is the 113th dedicated temple of the Church of Jesus Christ of Latter-day Saints (LDS Church). It is the third such temple that has been built in Illinois (the original Nauvoo Temple and Chicago Illinois Temple being the others).

History
Located in the town of Nauvoo, the temple's construction was announced on April 4, 1999, by church president Gordon B. Hinckley. Groundbreaking was conducted on October 24, 1999 and the cornerstones were laid November 5, 2000. The structure itself was built in the Greek Revival architectural style using limestone block quarried in Russellville, Alabama. It is built in the same location as the original structure that was dedicated in 1846.

The origins of the temple go back to 1937. In that year, Wilford C. Wood purchased some of the land on behalf of the LDS Church and purchased another piece of land that he later sold to the church. He also organized a group of church members from the Chicago Illinois Stake, co-led by Ariel S. Williams, to clear and beautify the recently purchased land. At the time, the Chicago Stake was one of only two east of the Mississippi River.

Wood purchased land in 1951 that included a house which was made a visitors center for the temple site. In the late-1950s, and then in 1962, agents for the LDS Church completed the purchase of the temple lot.

Exterior design and decoration
It is the only temple owned by the LDS Church today that has a bell tower, although the Kirtland Temple also has a bell tower. The angel on the first Nauvoo temple was a weather vane, sculpted of metal. The figure was positioned horizontally as if it were flying, clothed in a robe and cap. The angel held a book in one hand and a trumpet in the other.

Church leaders and architects carefully worked to replicate the original exterior design of the 19th-century temple, which was damaged by an arson fire in 1848 and by a tornado on May 27, 1850. It was consequently condemned and demolished by the Nauvoo City Council. Construction materials and furniture were derived from the original design as well.

Interior design and decoration
The interior floor plan of the temple is noticeably different from the original structure in which the endowment ceremony assumed its present format. At the direction of Joseph Smith, the west end of the attic story was divided by cloth partitions into four spaces used to administer the endowment. One of the canvas "rooms" was decorated with potted plants to suggest the Garden of Eden.

The Salt Lake City Endowment House and early Utah temples, each with a series of four ordinance rooms through which patrons moved during the presentation of the endowment, followed this layout. The first three rooms were decorated with murals representing, the creation of the world, the Garden of Eden, and the world after the fall of Adam and Eve. The fourth room, known as the Terrestrial Room, was ornately decorated but lacked murals. The Los Angeles California Temple, dedicated in 1956, was the last temple with this layout. Subsequent temples presented the endowment in one or two rooms without murals adorning the ordinance rooms. The use of murals resumed again in 2001 with the opening of the Columbia River Washington Temple.. The Nauvoo Illinois Temple, a throwback to the four room layout, is the sole exception, as it has the four-room progressive format with murals decorating the first three rooms.

Open house and dedication
After the temple was completed, a public open house from 6 May to 22 June 2002 attracted over 250,000 visitors to tour the temple. The completion and official dedication took place on June 27, 2002, on the anniversary of the death of Joseph Smith, the church's founder.

Up to 1.5 million visitors a year have visited Nauvoo since the temple opened in 2002.

In 2020, like all the church's other temples, the Nauvoo Illinois Temple was closed in response to the coronavirus pandemic.

Presidents
Notable presidents of the temple include Richard W. Winder (2002–04) and Spencer J. Condie (2010–13).

Gallery

References

External links

 Nauvoo Illinois Temple at ChurchofJesusChristTemples.org
 

21st-century Latter Day Saint temples
2002 establishments in Illinois
Buildings and structures in Hancock County, Illinois
Latter Day Saint movement in Illinois
Nauvoo, Illinois
Nauvoo Temple
Temples (LDS Church) completed in 2002
Temples (LDS Church) in Illinois
Tourist attractions in Hancock County, Illinois